The "first possession" theory of property holds that ownership of something is justified simply by someone seizing it before someone else does. This contrasts with the labor theory of property where something may become property only by applying productive labor to it, i.e. by making something out of the materials of nature.

See also
Labor theory of property
Utilitarian theory of property
Terra nullius

References

Theories of law
Property